Karen L. Thorson is an American television producer. Thorson was married to fellow producer Robert F. Colesberry until his death in 2004. She worked on all five seasons of The Wire. Before joining the crew of The Wire she worked as an associate producer and post-production manager in the film industry.

Thorson joined the production team as a co-producer in 2001 while they prepared the show's pilot episode. She retained her role for the show's second season. For the third, fourth, and fifth season she was credited as producer.

Following the conclusion of The Wire she became a co-producer for The Unusuals.

References

External links

Living people
American film producers
American television producers
Year of birth missing (living people)
Place of birth missing (living people)
American women television producers
Taft School alumni
21st-century American women